Chelsea McClammer (born March 1, 1994) is an American Paralympic athlete with Team USA, she has won two silver medals and one bronze at the 2016 Summer Paralympics.

Early life
McClammer played basketball, tennis and athletics as a child, but injured her spinal cord in a car accident when she was six years old and then she had to start with a wheelchair.

Career
Chelsea McClammer started competing in wheelchair racing when she was a tween. She was introduced to wheelchair racing at a sports convention and hired coach Theresa Skinner to train her for competitive racing. With Skinner as her coach, McClammer qualified for the U.S. Paralympics Track and Field Nationals at the age of 12.

As a freshman in high school, McClammer became the youngest member of Team USA in the 2008 Summer Paralympics in Beijing at 14 years old. In Beijing, McClammer qualified for the T54 finals and bested her personal record. She missed the first two weeks of school at Kiona-Benton City High School but upon her return, McClammer joined the school's cross country team. While competing with the team, she set a new state record with a time of 7:29 for 2.1 miles. However, after undergoing surgery for scoliosis, she competed in class T53.

In 2011, McClammer earned a bronze medal in the 800-meter race at the 2011 Parapan American Games in Guadalajara, Mexico. She also earned a gold medal with a time of 34.55 in the women's 200m T53, and another at the 100m. Upon graduating from high school, McClammer enrolled at the University of Illinois Urbana-Champaign.

As a student at the University of Illinois Urbana-Champaign, McClammer was named to Team USA's 2013 IPC Athletics World Championships team and competed in the women's 200 meters. McClammer won a bronze medal in the women's 200 meters T53 race with a time of 31.95. She later competed with Team USA at the 2015 IPC Athletics World Championships. She finished the competition placing fourth in the 800 T54 meter race.

In 2016, McClammer won two silver medals and one bronze in the women's 5,000 meters-T53/54, 4×400 relay-T53/54, and 1500 meter races at the 2016 Summer Paralympics. The next year, she competed with Team USA at the 2017 World Para Athletics Championships where she won a silver medal with a time of 55.50.

In 2019, McClammer tested positive for hydrochlorothiazide (HCTZ), a prohibited diuretic.  USADA found that the HCTZ appeared as a trace contaminant in a permitted prescription drug, without McClammer's knowledge and without cause of negligence. As a result, she accepted a finding of no fault and was not disqualified from any past or future competitions.

References

External links 
 Team USA bio
 Paralympic bio

Living people
1994 births
People from Benton County, Washington
Track and field athletes from Washington (state)
University of Illinois Urbana-Champaign alumni
Paralympic bronze medalists for the United States
Paralympic silver medalists for the United States
Athletes (track and field) at the 2008 Summer Paralympics
Athletes (track and field) at the 2016 Summer Paralympics
Medalists at the 2016 Summer Paralympics
American female track and field athletes
People with paraplegia
Paralympic medalists in athletics (track and field)
Paralympic track and field athletes of the United States
Medalists at the 2011 Parapan American Games
Medalists at the 2015 Parapan American Games
Medalists at the World Para Athletics Championships
Illinois Fighting Illini Paralympic athletes
21st-century American women